Thorganby could be

Thorganby, Lincolnshire
Thorganby, North Yorkshire

See also
Thormanby, North Yorkshire